Arianna Savall i Figueras (born 1972 in Basel, Switzerland) is a Swiss-born Spanish classical singer, harpist and composer. She sings in Catalan, French, English, Spanish, Portuguese and other languages of the world.

Life and career
Savall is the daughter of composer and viol player Jordi Savall and the late singer Montserrat Figueras, and the sister of Ferran Savall. She studied voice at the Conservatory of Terrassa with María Dolores Aldea in 1993. She graduated in harp from the Conservatory of Terrassa, Spain, in 1996, and obtained a degree in voice in 2000. In 1992, she began studying with Rolf Lislevand at the Toulouse Conservatory.

In 1996, Savall returned to Switzerland and attended a seminar led by Kurt Widmer at the Schola Cantorum Basiliensis. She has been a member of Hespèrion XXI and was part of her father's musical groups until 2008, when she created her own group Hirundo Maris, together with the Norwegian musician Petter Udland Johansen.
Since 2017 she teaches Baroque Harp at the Zurich University of the Arts.

Discography
 Bella Terra, 2003.
 Peiwoh (Alia Vox) 2009
 Chants du Sud et du Nord, 2012
Le Labyrinthe d'Ariane, 2020

References

External links
 Arianna Savall Official Site
 Arianna Savall at Youtube

1972 births
Living people
Spanish composers
Spanish expatriates in Switzerland
Schola Cantorum Basiliensis alumni
Spanish classical harpists
21st-century Spanish singers
21st-century Spanish women singers
Spanish women composers